Beyond Justice, also known as Desert Law, Law of the Desert and Maktub, Law of the Desert, is a 1991 Italian action-thriller film directed by Duccio Tessari that was shot in Morocco. The film was edited from the three-part, 300-minute 1989 Italian Canale 5 television miniseries Il principe del deserto.

Plot
When the estranged Moroccan husband (Kabir Bedi) of wealthy corporate head Christine Sanders (Carol Alt) takes their son Robert to Morocco, she hires two operatives (Rutger Hauer and Peter Sands) who specialize in rescuing hostages from terrorists to bring her son back. Robert is brought to his grandfather (Omar Sharif) who wishes the boy to succeed him as the ruler of his tribe.

Cast
 Rutger Hauer as Tom Burton  
 Carol Alt as Christine Sanders  
 Omar Sharif as Emir Beni-Zair  
 Elliott Gould as Red Merchantson  
 Kabir Bedi as Moulet Beni-Zair 
 Stewart Bick as Daniel
 David Flosi as Robert Sanders  
 Brett Halsey as Sal Cuomo  
 Peter Sands as James Ross  
 Christopher Ahrens as Bodyguard  
 Larry Dolgin as Duncan  
 D.R. Nanayakkara as El-Mahadi  
 David Thompson as Headmaster Bligh

References

External links

1991 films
1990s action drama films
1990s adventure films
Italian adventure films
Italian drama films
1990s Italian-language films
Films shot in Morocco
Films set in Morocco
Films directed by Duccio Tessari
Films scored by Ennio Morricone
Titanus films
Films edited from television programs
1991 drama films
Films with screenplays by Sergio Donati
1990s English-language films
1990s Italian films